The Central African Armed Forces (FACA) are the armed forces of the Central African Republic and have been barely functional since the outbreak of the civil war in 2012. Today they are among the world's weakest armed forces, dependent on international support to provide security in the country. In recent years the government has struggled to form a unified national army. It consists of the Ground Force (which includes the air service), the gendarmerie, and the National Police.

Its disloyalty to the president came to the fore during the mutinies in 1996–1997, and since then has faced internal problems. It has been strongly criticised by human rights organisations due to terrorism, including killings, torture and sexual violence. In 2013 when militants of the Séléka rebel coalition seized power and overthrew President Bozizé they executed many FACA troops.

History

Role of military in domestic politics
The military has played an important role in the history of Central African Republic. The immediate former president, General François Bozizé was a former army chief-of-staff and his government included several high-level military officers. Among the country's five presidents since independence in 1960, three have been former army chiefs-of-staff, who have taken power through coups d'état. No president with a military background has, however, ever been succeeded by a new military president.

The country's first president, David Dacko was overthrown by his army chief-of-staff, Jean-Bédel Bokassa in 1966. Following the ousting of Bokassa in 1979, David Dacko was restored to power, only to be overthrown once again in 1981 by his new army chief of staff, General André Kolingba.

In 1993, Ange-Félix Patassé became the Central African Republic's first elected president. He soon became unpopular within the army, resulting in violent mutinies in 1996–1997. In May 2001, there was an unsuccessful coup attempt by Kolingba and once again Patassé had to turn to friends abroad for support, this time Libya and DR Congo. Some months later, at the end of October, Patassé sacked his army chief-of-staff, François Bozizé, and attempted to arrest him. Bozizé then fled to Chad and gathered a group of rebels. In 2002, he seized Bangui for a short period, and in March 2003 took power in a coup d'état.

Importance of ethnicity
When General Kolingba became president in 1981, he implemented an ethnicity-based recruitment policy for the administration. Kolingba was a member of the Yakoma people from the south of the country, which made up approximately 5% of the total population. During his rule, members of Yakoma were granted all key positions in the administration and made up a majority of the military. This later had disastrous consequences when Kolingba was replaced by a member of a northerner tribe, Ange-Félix Patassé.

Army mutinies of 1996–1997
Soon after the election 1993, Patassé became unpopular within the army, not least because of his inability to pay their wages (partly due to economic mismanagement and partly because France suddenly ended its economic support for the soldiers' wages). Another reason for the irritation was that most of FACA consisted of soldiers from Kolingba's ethnic group, the Yakoma. During Patassé's rule they had become increasingly marginalised, while he created militias favouring his own Gbaya tribe, as well as neighbouring Sara and Kaba. This resulted in army mutinies in 1996–1997, where fractions of the military clashed with the presidential guard, the Unité de sécurité présidentielle (USP) and militias loyal to Patassé.

 On April 18, 1996, between 200 and 300 soldiers mutinied, claiming that they had not received their wages since 1992–1993. The confrontations between the soldiers and the presidential guard resulted in 9 dead and 40 wounded. French forces provided support (Operation Almandin I) and acted as negotiators. The unrest ended when the soldiers were finally paid their wages by France and the President agreed not to start legal proceedings against them.
 On May 18, 1996, a second mutiny was led by 500 soldiers who refused to be disarmed, denouncing the agreement reached in April. French forces were once again called to Bangui (Operation Almadin II), supported by the militaries of Chad and Gabon. 3,500 foreigners were evacuated during the unrest, which left 43 persons dead and 238 wounded.
 On May 26, a peace agreement was signed between France and the mutineers. The latter were promised amnesty, and were allowed to retain their weapons. Their security was ensured by the French military.
 On November 15, 1996, a third mutiny took place, and 1,500 French soldiers were flown in to ensure the safety of foreigners. The mutineers demanded the discharge of the president.

On 6 December, a negotiation process started, facilitated by Gabon, Burkina-Faso, Chad and Mali. The military — supported by the opposition parties — insisted that Patassé had to resign. In January, 1997, however, the Bangui Agreements were signed and the French EFAO troop were replaced by the 1,350 soldiers of the Mission interafricaine de surveillance des Accords de Bangui (MISAB). In March, all mutineers were granted amnesty. The fighting between MISAB and the mutineers continued with a large offensive in June, resulting in up to 200 casualties. After this final clash, the mutineers calmed.

After the mutinies, President Patassé suffered from a typical "dictator's paranoia", resulting in a period of cruel terror executed by the presidential guard and various militias within the FACA loyal to the president, such as the Karako. The violence was directed against the Yakoma tribe, of which it is estimated that 20,000 persons fled during this period. The oppression also targeted other parts of the society. The president accused his former ally France of supporting his enemies and sought new international ties. When he strengthened his presidential guard (creating the FORSIDIR, see below), Libya sent him 300 additional soldiers for his own personal safety. When former President Kolingba attempted a coup d'état in 2001 (which was, according to Patassé, supported by France), the Movement for the Liberation of the Congo (MLC) of Jean-Pierre Bemba in DR Congo came to his rescue.

Crimes conducted by Patassé's militias and Congolese soldiers during this period are now being investigated by the International Criminal Court, who wrote that "sexual violence appears to have been a central feature of the conflict", having identified more than 600 rape victims.

Present situation
The FACA has been dominated by soldiers from the Yakoma ethnic group since the time of Kolingba. It has hence been considered disloyal by the two northerner presidents Patassé and Bozizé, both of whom have equipped and run their own militias outside FACA. The military also proved its disloyalty during the mutinies in 1996–1997. Although Francois Bozizé had a background in FACA himself (being its chief-of-staff from 1997 to 2001), he was cautious by retaining the defence portfolio, as well as by appointing his son Jean-Francis Bozizé cabinet director in charge of running the Ministry of Defence. He kept his old friend General Antoine Gambi as Chief of Staff. Due to failure to curb deepening unrest in the northern part of the country, Gambi was in July 2006 replaced with Bozizé's old friend from the military academy, Jules Bernard Ouandé.

Military's relations with the society
The forces assisting Bozizé in seizing the power in 2003 were not paid what they were promised and started looting, terrorising and killing ordinary citizens. Summary executions took place with the implicit approval of the government. The situation has deteriorated since early 2006, and the regular army and the presidential guard regularly execute extortion, torture, killings and other human rights violations. There is no possibility for the national judicial system to investigate these cases. At the end of 2006, there were an estimated 150,000 internally displaced people in CAR. During a UN mission in the northern part of the country in November 2006, the mission had a meeting with a prefect who said that he could not maintain law and order over the military and the presidential guards. The FACA currently conducts summary executions and burns houses. On the route between Kaga-Bandoro and Ouandago some 2,000 houses have been burnt, leaving an estimated 10,000 persons homeless.

Reform of the army
Both the Multinational Force in the Central African Republic (FOMUC) and France are assisting in the current reform of the army. One of the key priorities of the reform of the military is make it more ethnically diversified. It should also integrate Bozizé's own rebel group (mainly consisting of members of his own Gbaya tribe). Many of the Yakoma soldiers who left the country after the mutinies in 1996–1997 have now returned and must also be reintegrated into the army. At the same time, BONUCA holds seminars in topics such as the relationship between military and civil parts of society. 2018 saw Russia send mercenaries to help train and equip the CAR military and by 2020 Russia has increased its influence in the region.

Army equipment

Most of the army's heavy weapons and equipment were destroyed or captured by Séléka militants during the 2012–2014 civil war. In the immediate aftermath of the war, the army was only in possession of 70 rifles. The majority of its arsenals were plundered during the fighting by the Séléka coalition and other armed groups. Thousands of the army's small arms were also distributed to civilian supporters of former President Bozizé in 2013. Prior to 2014, the army's stocks of arms and ammunition were primarily of French, Soviet, and Chinese origin.

In 2018, the army's equipment stockpiles were partly revitalized by a donation of 900 pistols, 5,200 rifles, and 270 unspecified rocket launchers from Russia.

Infantry weapons

Vehicles

Artillery

Foreign military presence in support of the Government

Peacekeeping and peace enforcing forces 
Since the mutinies, a number of peacekeeping and peace enforcing international missions have been present in Central African Republic. There has been discussion of the deployment of a regional United Nations (UN) peacekeeping force in both Chad and Central African Republic, in order to potentially shore up the ineffectual Darfur Peace Agreement. The missions deployed in the country during the last 10 years are the following:

Chad 
In addition to the multilateral forces, CAR has received bilateral support from other African countries, such as the Libyan and Congolese assistance to Patassé mentioned above. Bozizé is in many ways dependent on Chad's support. Chad has an interest in CAR, since it needs to ensure calmness close to its oil fields and the pipeline leading to the Cameroonian coast, close to CAR's troubled northwest. Before seizing power, Bozizé built up his rebel force in Chad, trained and augmented by the Chadian military. Chadian President Déby assisted him actively in taking the power in March 2003 (his rebel forces included 100 Chadian soldiers). After the coup, Chad provided another 400 soldiers. Current direct support includes 150 non-FOMUC Chadian troops that patrol the border area near Goré, a contingent of soldiers in Bangui, and troops within the presidential lifeguard. The CEMAC Force includes 121 Chadian soldiers.

France 
There has been an almost uninterrupted French military presence in Central African Republic since independence, regulated through agreements between the two Governments. French troops were allowed to be based in the country and to intervene in cases of destabilisation. This was particularly important during the cold war era, when Francophone Africa was regarded as a natural French sphere of influence.

Additionally, the strategic location of the country made it a more interesting location for military bases than its neighbours, and Bouar and Bangui were hence two of the most important French bases abroad.

However, in 1997, following Lionel Jospin's expression "Neither interference nor indifference", France came to adopt new strategic principles for its presence in Africa. This included a reduced permanent presence on the continent and increased support for multilateral interventions. In Central African Republic, the Bouar base and the Béal Camp (at that time home to 1,400 French soldiers) in Bangui were shut down, as the French concentrated its African presence to Abidjan, Dakar, Djibouti, Libreville and N'Djamena and the deployment of a Force d'action rapide, based in France.

However, due to the situation in the country, France has retained a military presence. During the mutinies, 2,400 French soldiers patrolled the streets of Bangui. Their official task was to evacuate foreign citizens, but this did not prevent direct confrontations with the mutineers (resulting in French and mutineer casualties). The level of French involvement resulted in protests among the Central African population, since many sided with the mutineers and accused France of defending a dictator against the people's will. Criticism was also heard in France, where some blamed their country for its protection of a discredited ruler, totally incapable of exerting power and managing the country. After the mutinies in 1997, the MISAB became a multilateral force, but it was armed, equipped, trained and managed by France. The Chadian, Gabonese and Congolese troops of the current Force multinationale en Centrafrique (FOMUC) mission in the country also enjoy logistical support from French soldiers.

A study carried out by the US Congressional Research Service revealed that France has again increased its arms sales to Africa, and that during the 1998–2005 period it was the leading supplier of arms to the continent.

Components and units

Air Force

The Air Force is almost inoperable. Lack of funding has almost grounded the air force apart from an AS 350 Ecureuil delivered in 1987. Mirage F1 planes from the French Air Force regularly patrolled troubled regions of the country and also participated in direct confrontations until they were withdrawn and retired in 2014. According to some sources, Bozizé used the money he got from the mining concession in Bakouma to buy two old MI 8 helicopters from Ukraine and one Lockheed C-130 Hercules, built in the 1950s, from the USA. In late 2019 Serbia offered two new Soko J-22 orao attack aircraft to the CAR Air Force but was it is unknown whether the orders were approved by the Air Force. The air force otherwise operates 7 light aircraft, including a single helicopter:

Garde républicaine (GR)

The Presidential Guard (garde présidentielle) or Republican Guard is officially part of FACA but it is often regarded as a separate entity under the direct command of the President. Since 2010 the Guard has received training from South Africa and Sudan, with Belgium and Germany providing support. GR consists of so-called patriots that fought for Bozizé when he seized power in 2003 (mainly from the Gbaya tribe), together with soldiers from Chad. They are guilty of numerous assaults on the civil population, such as terror, aggression, sexual violence. Only a couple of months after Bozizé's seizure of power, in May 2003, taxi and truck drivers conducted a strike against these outrages. However, post-civil leaders have been cautious in attempting to significantly reform the Republican Guard.

New amphibious force
Bozizé has created an amphibious force. It is called the Second Battalion of the Ground Forces and it patrols the Ubangi river. The staff of the sixth region in Bouali (mainly made up of members of the former president's lifeguard) was transferred to the city of Mongoumba, located on the river. This city had previously been plundered by forces from the MLC, that had crossed the CAR/Congo border. The riverine patrol force has approximately one hundred personnel and operates seven patrol boats.

Veteran Soldiers
A program for disarmament and reintegration of veteran soldiers is currently taking place. A national commission for the disarmament, demobilisation and reintegration was put in place in September 2004. The commission is in charge of implementing a program wherein approximately 7,500 veteran soldiers will be reintegrated in civil life and obtain education.

Discontinued groups and units that are no longer part of FACA

 Séléka rebels: the French document Spécial investigation: Centrafrique, au cœur du chaos envisions Séléka rebels as mercenaries under the command of the president. In the documentary the Séléka fighters seem to use a large number of M16 rifles in their fight against the Anti-balaka forces.
  FORSIDIR: The presidential lifeguard, Unité de sécurité présidentielle (USP), was in March 1998 transformed into the Force spéciale de défense des institutions républicaines (FORSDIR). In contrary to the army – which consisted mainly of southerner Yakoma members and which thereby was unreliable for the northerner president – this unit consisted of northerners loyal to the president. Before eventually being dissolved in January 2000, this highly controversial group became feared for their terror and troubled Patassé's relations with important international partners, such as France. Of its 1,400 staff, 800 were subsequently reintegrated into FACA, under the command of the chief-of-staff. The remaining 400 recreated the USP (once again under the command of the chief-of-staff).
  Unité de sécurité présidentielle (USP):  USP was Patassé's presidential guard before and after FORSIDIR. When he was overthrown by Bozizé in 2003, the USP was dissolved and while some of the soldiers have been absorbed by FACA, others are believed to have joined the pro-Patassé Democratic Front of the Central African People rebel group that is fighting FACA in the north of the country.
  The Patriots or Liberators:  Accompanied Bozizé when he seized power in March 2003. They are now a part of Bozizé's lifeguard, the Garde républicaine, together with soldiers from Chad.
  Office central de répression du banditisme (OCRB): OCRB was a special unit within the police created to fight the looting after the army mutinies in 1996 and 1997. OCRB has committed numerous summary executions and arbitrary detentions, for which it has never been put on trial.
  MLPC Militia:  Le Mouvement de libération du peuple centrafricain (MLPC) was the armed component of former president Patassé's political party. The MPLC's militia was already active during the 1993 election, but was strengthened during the mutinies 1996 and 1997, particularly through its Karako contingent. Its core consisted of Sara people from Chad and Central African Republic, but during the mutinies it recruited many young people in Bangui.
  DRC Militia: Rassemblement démocratique centrafricain (RDC) is the militia of the party of General Kolingba, who led the country during the 1980s. The RDC's militia is said to have camps in Mobaye and to have bonds with former officials of Kolingba's "cousin" Mobutu Sese Seko in DR Congo.

References

External links
'France donates equipment to CAR,' Jane's Defence Weekly, 28 January 2004, p. 20. First of three planned battalions of new army completed training and guaduated 15 January [2004]. See also JDW 12 November 2003.
Africa Research Bulletin: Political, Social and Cultural Series, Volume 43 Issue 12, Pages 16909A – 16910A, Published Online: 26 January 2007: Operation Boali, French aid mission to FACA

CIA World Factbook
US Department of State – Bureau of African Affairs: Background note
"Spécial investigation: Centrafrique, au cœur du chaos" Giraf Prod 13 jan 2014

Government of the Central African Republic
Military of the Central African Republic